Stedman is a town in Cumberland County, North Carolina, United States. The population was 1,028 at the 2010 census. It is named for Civil War Major Charles Manly Stedman.

History
Stedman was settled in 1841 when John Culbreth Blocker built a stagecoach house and post office on land that he had purchased. The town was incorporated in 1917.

The Maxwell House was listed on the National Register of Historic Places in 1985.

Geography
Stedman is located in eastern Cumberland County at  (35.014080, -78.697312). North Carolina Highway 24 passes through the town, leading west  to Fayetteville, the county seat, and east  to Clinton.

Demographics

2020 census

As of the 2020 United States census, there were 1,277 people, 501 households, and 329 families residing in the town.

2000 census
As of the census of 2000, there were 664 people, 261 households, and 196 families residing in the town. The population density was 484.0 people per square mile (187.1/km). There were 286 housing units at an average density of 208.5 per square mile (80.6/km). The racial makeup of the town was 82.53% White, 12.50% African American, 1.05% Native American, 0.45% Asian, 0.15% Pacific Islander, 1.20% from other races, and 2.11% from two or more races. Hispanic or Latino of any race were 2.41% of the population.

There were 261 households, out of which 32.2% had children under the age of 18 living with them, 57.1% were married couples living together, 12.6% had a female householder with no husband present, and 24.9% were non-families. 20.7% of all households were made up of individuals, and 7.7% had someone living alone who was 65 years of age or older. The average household size was 2.54 and the average family size was 2.93.

In the town, the population was spread out, with 23.8% under the age of 18, 7.1% from 18 to 24, 28.8% from 25 to 44, 28.2% from 45 to 64, and 12.2% who were 65 years of age or older. The median age was 40 years. For every 100 females, there were 96.4 males. For every 100 females age 18 and over, there were 89.5 males.

The median income for a household in the town was $47,321, and the median income for a family was $55,294. Males had a median income of $36,250 versus $21,875 for females. The per capita income for the town was $19,233. About 4.3% of families and 10.0% of the population were below the poverty line, including 18.8% of those under age 18 and 12.3% of those age 65 or over.

References

Towns in Cumberland County, North Carolina
Towns in North Carolina
Fayetteville, North Carolina metropolitan area
Populated places established in 1841
1841 establishments in North Carolina